Notable brothers and alumni of Sigma Pi.

Founders
Rolin Roscoe James – (October 16, 1879 – February 4, 1953) Graduated from Vincennes University in 1899 before earning his A.B. degree from Earlham College in 1902.  Studied law at Harvard Law School before becoming an attorney.
James Thompson Kingsbury – (January 8, 1877 to October 1, 1950) Graduated from Vincennes University in 1897 and received his law degree from the University of Illinois in 1902.  Practiced law in Bisbee, Arizona.
William Raper Kennedy – (November 22, 1877 – December 5, 1944) Graduated from Vincennes University in 1897 and served in the Spanish–American War. Was in almost continuous military service for the rest of his life, rising from private to lieutenant colonel. He was a member of the faculty at Culver Military Academy from 1905 to 1944.
George Martin Patterson – (November 7, 1877 – April 7, 1960) Graduated from Vincennes University in 1897. Became the Deputy Recorder for Knox County, Indiana for six years before becoming a farmer.

Arts and entertainment

Business

Education

Government and law

National

Legislators

Judges

Ambassadors

Appointees

State/Provincial/Territorial

Governors

Legislators

Judges

Other offices

Local

Mayors

Journalism

Military

Other

Religion

Science, technology and exploration

Sports

Baseball

Basketball

College Athletic Directors

Football

Olympics

Others

References

brothers
Sigma Pi